The Yangcun Bridge is a railway bridge located in China. The construction of the bridge was completed in 2007.

References 

Railway bridges in China
Bridges completed in 2007